Distillery 291 is a whiskey distillery in Colorado Springs, Colorado.

Distillery 291 produces grain-to-glass whiskey from a small production facility. Two of its best-known whiskeys are 291 Colorado Rye Whiskey and 291 Colorado Bourbon Whiskey. Both brands are charcoal mellowed with Colorado aspen staves. 

Distillery 291 Whiskey has won numerous awards for its whiskey brands. Distillery 291 whiskey is sold in Colorado and California.

History 
Distillery 291 was established on September 11, 2011, by Michael Myers. A New York City fashion photographer,  Myers moved to Colorado after 2001.

On a flight home from New York, Myers read an article about the creator of Sailor Jerry and Hendrick's Gin, and thought, "I could do that."  In Colorado Springs, Myers made an agreement with Mike Bristol, owner of  Bristol Brewing Company] for assistance in getting started. On September 11, 2011, Distillery 291 produced its first batch of whiskey.

Product description

El Paso County Process 
Distillery 291 uses a technique called El Paso County Process in whiskey production. Created by founder, Michael Myers, El Paso County Process is the action of taking a finished beer, boiling off the alcohol and using a percentage of that stillage mixed with a water mash in the next batch.

Television appearances 
Distillery 291 Colorado Whiskey appears to be the whiskey of choice for character Beau in Season 2 of Netflix's The Ranch.

Awards 
291 Colorado Rye Whiskey

World's Best Rye, World Whiskies Awards, ;;Whisky Magazine, 2018 
Best American Rye, World Whiskies Awards, ;;Whisky Magazine, 2018 
Gold Medal: San Francisco World Spirits Competition, 2017

Double Gold Medal: Denver International Spirits Competition 2017

Best American Rye Whisky / No Age Statement: ;;Whisky Magazine World Whisky Awards 2016

94 Points Barrel #2: Jim Murray's Whisky Bible 2013

People's Choice Award: Breckenridge Craft Spirits Festival Awards 2014, 2015, 2016

291 Colorado Bourbon Whiskey

Silver Medal: Denver International Spirits Competition 2017

Gold Medal: Denver International Spirits Competition 2016

91 Points Barrel #1: Jim Murray's Whisky Bible 2016

Double Gold: San Francisco World Spirits Competition 2016

People's Choice Award: Breckenridge Craft Spirits Festival Awards 2014, 2015, 2016

291 American Whiskey

People's Choice Award: Breckenridge Craft Spirits Festival Awards 2014, 2015, 2016

291 Fresh Whiskey

87.5 Points Batch #1: Jim Murray's Whisky Bible 2013

People's Choice Award: Breckenridge Craft Spirits Festival Awards 2014, 2015, 2016

291 Colorado Rye Whiskey White Dog

90 Points Batch #1: Jim Murray's Whisky Bible

People's Choice Award: Breckenridge Craft Spirits Festival Awards 2014, 2015, 2016

The Decc

Gold 93 Points: Beverage Tasting Institute 2014

People's Choice Award: Breckenridge Craft Spirits Festival Awards 2014, 2015, 2016

291 Colorado Whiskey Barrel Proof

Best American Rye Whisky / No Age Statement: Whisky Magazine World Whisky Awards 2016

People's Choice Award: Breckenridge Craft Spirits Festival Awards 2014, 2015, 2016

291 Colorado Bourbon Whiskey Barrel Proof

People's Choice Award: Breckenridge Craft Spirits Festival Awards 2014, 2015, 2016

291 HR Colorado Bourbon Whiskey

People's Choice Award: Breckenridge Craft Spirits Festival Awards 2014, 2015, 2016

291 Bad Guy Colorado Bourbon Whiskey

Silver Medal: San Francisco World Spirits Competition, 2017

Gold Medal: Denver International Spirits Competition, 2017

95.5 Points Barrel #1: Jim Murray's Whisky Bible, 2014

Gold: Breckenridge Craft Spirits Festival Awards 2013, 2016

People's Choice Award: Breckenridge Craft Spirits Festival Awards 2014, 2015, 2016

291 E Colorado Whiskey

2015 ”E” Batch #1 Colorado Rye Whisky 126.1 Proof

95.5 Points Barrel #1: Jim Murray's Whisky Bible, 2017

2016“E” Batch #2 Colorado Bourbon Whisky 126.8 Proof

Silver Medal: San Francisco World Spirits Competition, 2017

References

External links
 

Distilleries in Colorado